Miss Polonia 2009 was the 35th Miss Polonia pageant, held on October 24, 2009. The winner was Maria Nowakowska of Lower Silesia and she represented Poland in Miss Universe 2010. Top 5 finalist Beata Polakowska represented Poland at Miss Earth 2010. Top 10 finalist Żaneta Sitko represented the country at Miss International 2010.

Final results

Special Awards

Official Delegates

Notes

Withdrawals
 Polish Community in Canada
 Polish Community in the U.S.

Did not compete
 Polish Community in Argentina
 Polish Community in Belarus
 Polish Community in Brazil
 Polish Community in France
 Polish Community in Germany
 Polish Community in Ireland
 Polish Community in Israel
 Polish Community in Russia
 Polish Community in South Africa
 Polish Community in the U.K.
 Polish Community in Venezuela

References

External links
Official Website

2009
2009 beauty pageants
2009 in Poland